Chintan Upadhyay  (born 1972) is an Indian artist. He was awarded the Charles Wallace Foundation Award for Residency in Bristol, UK in 2012. He began as a painter, but now creates sculptures and installations, the surfaces of which he paints.

His best known sculpture project is perhaps the Pet Shop project, which is an ongoing production of a "model baby" for every season, Baby fetish.

Early life
Chintan was born in 1972 in Partapur, Rajasthan, India, and gained a BFA Painting Faculty of Fine Arts from Maharaja Sayajirao University of Baroda, Gujarat, India in 1995 and MFA Painting Faculty of Fine Arts from M.S. University, Gujarat, India in 1997.

Accused of murder
In December 2015, Upadhyay was accused and arrested in connection with the double murder of his estranged wife Hema Upadhyay and her lawyer Haresh Bhambhani. Their bodies were found in khakhi-coloured cardboard boxes floating in a nullah. He has twice been denied bail and the case is ongoing.

Solo shows
2010 'Nature God', Sakshi Gallery, Taipei
2009–10 'Mistake', Inda Gallery, Budapest
2009 'Khatti Mithi', Project at Sakshi Gallery, Mumbai
2009 'Iconic Shrine', Jawahar Kala Kendra, Jaipur in collaboration with Roundabout and Gallery Soulflower, Bangkok
2008 'Mistake', Aicon Gallery, London
2008 'Pet Shop', Ashish Balram Nagpal Galleries, Mumbai
2008 'New Indians', Galerie Natalie Seroussi, Paris
2008 'Metastasis of Signs – A Walk in the Realm of Manipulated Realities', Gallery Espace, New Delhi
2007 'Tentuaa Dabaa Do (Kill Her)', Jawahar Kala Kendra, Jaipur, Rajasthan
2006 'I Want To Be An International Artist', Solo Performance, Seoul Art Centre, Korea
2006 'Clone Vitthala', Sculptures at Ashish Balram Nagpal Gallery, Mumbai
2006 'Maya', Paintings at Ashish Balram Nagpal Gallery, Mumbai
2005 'Baar Baar, Har Baar, Kitni Baar?', Installation and Interactive Performance, Sarjan Art Gallery, Vadodara
2004 'Conker's’, Installation Project, Spike Island, Bristol, UK
2004 'Designer Babies', Ashish Balram Nagpal Gallery, Mumbai
2003 'New Breed / Hybrid', Jehangir Art Gallery, Mumbai
2002 'Commemorative Stamps', Ashish Balram Nagpal Gallery, Mumbai
2002 'Commemorative Stamps', Jawahar Kala Kendra, Jaipur
2002 'Floating thoughts', Interactive site-specific installation, Brisbane, Australia
1999 'So What', The Fine Art Company, Mumbai
1998 'This has been done before', Shahjehan Art Gallery, New Delhi
1996 'Desirable Objects', Leela Kempenski Art Gallery, Mumbai

Group shows
2012 '2 + 2 = 5', The Palette Art Gallery, New Delhi
2012 'Looking Back, Looking Forward', Sakshi Gallery, Mumbai
2012 'Mapmakers: The Evolution of Contemporary Indian Art', Aicon Gallery, New York
2012 'Contemporary: A Selection of Modern and Contemporary Art', presented by Sakshi Gallery at The Park, Chennai
2012 'Sightings', Sakshi Gallery, Mumbai
2011 'Adbhutam: Rasa in Indian Art', Centre of International Modern Art (CIMA), Kolkata
2011 'Skin Deep: The Art of Fibreglass', The Viewing Room, Mumbai
2011 'Between Seasons', Gallery Beyond, Mumbai
2011 'Love is a 4 Letter Word', Latitude 28, New Delhi
2011 'Fabular Bodies: New Narratives in the Art of the Miniature', presented by Harmony Art Foundation at Coomaraswamy Hall, Chhatrapati Shivaji Maharah Vastu Sangrahalaya, Mumbai
2011 'Anecdotes', Sakshi Gallery, Mumbai
2011 'High-Light', presented by Sakshi Gallery, Mumbai at The Oberoi, Gurgaon
2011 'Dolls', Gallery Sumukha, Bangalore
2011 'Tech-Cut-Edge-Revelations', Ashna Gallery, New Delhi
2010 'Changing Skin', presented by The Fine Art Company at Coomaraswamy Hall, Chattrapati Shivaji Maharaj Vastu Sangrahalay, Mumbai
2010 'A. SYCO', The Viewing Room, Mumbai
2009 'Home Sweet Home', Religare Arts. i Gallery, New Delhi
2009 'Indian Summer', Galerie Christian Hosp, Berlin
2009 'Inaugural Show', Sakshi Gallery, Taipei
2008–09 'Signs Taken for Wonders: Recent Art from India and Pakistan', Aicon Gallery, London
2008–09 'Hot Shots', The Viewing Room, Mumbai
2008 'Uncovered', Sans Tache Art Gallery, Mumbai
2008 ‘Keep Drawing’, Gallery Espace, New Delhi
2008 'The Ethics of Encounter', Gallery Soulflower, Bangkok
2008 'Indiavata', Gallery Sun Contemporary, Korea
2008 'Link', Sakshi Art Gallery, Mumbai
2008 ‘Freedom 2008 : Sixty Years After Indian Independence’, Centre for International Modern Art (CIMA), Kolkata
2007 ‘Telling It Like It Is: The Indian Story’, The Gallery in Cork Street, London
2007 ‘Here and Now: Contemporary Voices from India’, Grosvenor Gallery, London
2007 ‘Young Guns’, Institute of Contemporary Indian Art (ICIA), Mumbai
2007 'Keep Drawing', Pundole Art Gallery, Mumbai
2006 ‘Bombay Maximum City’, Lille 3000, Lille, France
2005 -06 ‘Kaam’, Arts India Gallery, New York and Palo Alto, USA
2005 ‘Annual Exhibition’, Sakshi Art Gallery, Mumbai
2005 ‘Indian Contemporary Art’, Preview TATE Britain
2005 ‘Configuration’, Anant Art Gallery, New Delhi
2005 ‘Ways Of Seeing’, Gallery Art Alive, New Delhi
2005 ‘Papereshi’, Sarjan Art Gallery, Vadodara
2005 ‘Present-Future’, National Gallery of Modern Art (NGMA), Mumbai
2005 ‘Indian Contemporary Art’, Chelsea College of Art, London
2005 ‘Are We Like This Only?’, Rabindra Bhavan, Vadhera Art Gallery, New Delhi
2004 ‘Bombay Boys’, Palette Art Gallery, New Delhi
2004 ‘Charles Wallace Foundation Awards’, British Council, New Delhi
2004 ‘Concepts and Ideas’, Centre for International Modern art (CIMA), Kolkata
2004 Gallery 27, Oslo, Norway
2004 – 03 ‘Portraits of a Decade’, Centre for International Modern art (CIMA), Kolkata and Jehangir Art Gallery, Mumbai
2004 – 03 ‘Dots and Pixels’, Digital media, Sumukha Art Gallery, Bangalore and Gallery Espace, New Delhi
2004 ‘Bombay 17’, Kashi Art Gallery, Kochi
2003 ‘Parthenogenesis’, Ivan Dougherty Gallery, Sydney, Australia
2003 ‘Corresponding Latitudes’, A Cross Cultural Collaborative Exhibition of Indian and Australian artists, Jawahar Kala Kendra – Jaipur
2002 ‘ Brahma to Bapu', Icons and Symbols in Indian art, Habitat centre, New Delhi, India and Centre for International Modern art (CIMA), Kolkata
2002 ‘Quotable Stencil’, Tao Art Gallery, Mumbai
2001 ‘ Annual show’, Gallery Wren, Sydney, Australia
2000 ‘Sic.’, an Audio-visual Installation, The Fine Art Company, Mumbai
1999 'Mumbai Metaphor’ Tao Art Gallery, Mumbai
1999 ‘Wall Paper’, Lakeeren Art Gallery, Mumbai
1997 ‘Class of 1997’, Lakeeren Art Gallery, Mumbai
1997 ‘50 yr. of Indian Independence’, All India Fine Arts and Crafts Society, Delhi and Ravi Shankar Rawal Bhavan, Ahmedabad – Gujarat

Joint shows
2005 ‘You Have to Decide’ an Interactive Installation and Performance Center for Art and Culture, Chiksarda, Transylvania, Romania
2005 'I‘m a slut', a Collaborative Video and Performance with Amit Kekre, Gallery Beyond, Mumbai
2004 'Made in China', Collaborative Installation with Hema Upadhyay, Viart Gallery, New Delhi
2003 'Made in China', Collaborative Installation with Hema Upadhyay, Gallery Chemould, Mumbai
2003 'Post Card', Project with Hema Upadhyay, part of 'Parthenogenesis', Ivan Dougherty Gallery, Sydney
2000 Objects of Desire, Collaboration with Hema Upadhyay, 'Art and Technology', Ideas and Images II, National Gallery of Modern Art (NGMA), Mumbai
1995 'Circa Early Seventies', Faculty of Fine Arts, Maharaja Sayajirao University, Vadodara
1994 'Discount 33%', Faculty of Fine Arts, Maharaja Sayajirao University, Vadodara

Honours and awards
 2004–05 Charles Wallace Foundation Award for a residency in Bristol, UK
 2000–01 Gadi scholarship, NLKA, New Delhi
 1998 Lalit Kala Academy for Outstanding Drawing in a drawing exhibition
 1997 All India Avantika art exhibition, New Delhi
 1996 Lalit Kala Academy for Outstanding Painting in the annual exhibition S.C.Z.C.C. for Outstanding Painting in the annual exhibition, Nagpur, Maharashtra
 1995–97 Lalit Kala Academy for Outstanding Painting in the annual exhibition

References

External links
“Profile, Interview and artworks” Saffronart
“Chintan Upadhyay Exhibitions” Aicongallery
"The art of making babies" September 8, 2011 The Hindu
"Time for Chintan" February 8, 2013 The Hindu
"Art on the street" June 2, 2014 LiveMint
"Artist Profile" Conceptioart

Indian male painters
1972 births
Living people
Maharaja Sayajirao University of Baroda alumni
Indian contemporary painters
21st-century Indian painters
People from Banswara district
Painters from Rajasthan
20th-century Indian male artists
21st-century Indian male artists